Caritas Spain ("Cáritas España" in Spanish) is the Catholic Church's official organization in Spain for charity and social relief, instituted by the Spanish Episcopal Conference.

On 9 March 1981 it was registered as a religious entity with Spain's Ministry of Justice.

Organization
Caritas Spain is a Spanish confederation of Catholic relief, development, and social service organizations operating in Spain. It consists of 68 regional member organizations known as diocese.

Its national headquarters is in Madrid, from there it provides general assistance to its dioceses.

See also
 Caritas Internationalis
 Caritas Europa

References

External links
 

Christian organisations based in Spain
Catholic Church in Spain
Caritas Internationalis